Cass Township is a township in Texas County, in the U.S. state of Missouri.

Cass Township was originally called "Benton Township", and under the latter name was established in 1845, and named after Thomas Hart Benton.   The present name, adopted in 1850, honors Lewis Cass.

References

Townships in Missouri
Townships in Texas County, Missouri